Fieracavalli is an international show dedicated to horses and horse riding, which takes place in Verona every year from 1898 in early November.
Since 2001 the Festival hosts the only Italian stage Rolex FEI World Cup, International Grand Prix jump obstacles. The Italian stage Jumping Verona is held inside the Exhibition Centre during the event.

References

External links

 Official website

Fairs in Italy
Annual fairs
Autumn events in Italy